The Basketball tournament at the 2015 African Games was held from September 9–18, 2015 at several venues.

Competition format
The teams with the four best records qualified for the knockout stage, which was a single-elimination tournament. The semifinal winners contested for the gold medal, while the losers played for the bronze medal.

Calendar

Men's competition

Women's competition

Medals table

Medal summary

References

External links
Men's Results
Women's Results

 
2015 African Games
2015 in African basketball
Basketball at the African Games